The Kanchrapara Railway Workshop is one of the major workshops of Indian Railways, and is located in the Sealdah division of the Eastern Railway zone. It is divided into two complexes — Loco Complex and Carriage Complex. It caters to the major overhauling of a large product mix of IR, including locomotives (WAP7, WAP4, WAG9, WAG7, WAG5, WAM4), ICF Coaches, EMUs, MEMUs, DEMUs, Tower Cars, etc. Its mention can be found in Satyajit Ray's short story "Patol Babu Superstar", which was also included in the Class 10 English Communicative Curriculum of the CBSE.

History 
Kanchrapara Railway Workshop was established in 1863. Initial activities included the periodic overhauling of steam locomotives, wooden body Carriage and Wagons. The workshop also carried out overhauling and repair of aircraft during world war as well as manufacture of armoured cars and hand-grenade shells. This workshop also had the privilege of turning out the first electric locomotive after Periodic Overhauling (POH) in 1965 and the first Electric Multiple Unit motor coach was turned out after POH in the very same year.

Organizational structure 
The workshop is headed by an SAG grade officer designated as Chief Workshop Manager.

Loco Complex 
This is first complex which was established as part of workshop. Being used for overhauling of locomotives, it was named loco complex. Active shops :

 Wheel Shop (Shop 2A) : It carries out rediscing/overhauling of wheel sets of electric locomotives and EMUs.
 Heavy Corrosion Repair Shop
 Welding Shop (Shop 3)
 Locomotive POH and Erection Shop (Shop 11)
 EMU POH and Erection Shop (Shop 11A)
 Apparatus Overhauling Shop (Shop 9 and 9A)
 Armature Rewinding Shop (Shop 14)
 Bogie Overhauling and Mechanical Repair Shop (Shop 10)
 Crane Maintenance Shop (Shop 6)
 EC Loco Shop (Shop 12).

Stores Depot 
It caters to the requirements of workshop as well as loco sheds and EMU carsheds of Eastern Railway. It is headed by a Senior Scale Officer under independent charge.

Carriage Complex 
This part was established in 1914.

Halisahar Stores Depot 
It is headed by Deputy Chief Material Manager, an Indian Railway Stores Service officer.

Kanchrapara Railway Hospital 
It is headed by Chief Medical Superintendent.

Performance Figures

Supervisors' Training Centre 
It is headed by Vice Principal (an Assistant Scale officer). Apart from supervisors, it also imparts training to technicians.

Notable Achievements 

 Dual Mode Shunting Loco.
25 kV CUM Battery Operated Shunting Car,
Self Powered Inspection Car.
Self Powered Medical Relief Van.

Certifications 

 ISO 9001 in September 2005 
 ISO 14001 in March, 2018
 OHSAS 18001 in March, 2018
 ISO 3834 (Welding Quality Assurance) in Jan 2018.
 ISO 50001 in June 2018
 5-S on selective shops since December 2017 (Shop 2A,11,17).

Clubs/Welfare Institutes

Railway Officers' Club 

It is primarily meant for conferences and railway cultural events. It includes sports facilities like Lawn Tennis (turf), Badminton (wooden court), Billiards, swimming pool, etc. for railway employees only. The halls and open spaces are also open for public booking.

Officers' Rest House is a part of it and can be used by any officer of Govt. of India for official/private purpose.

Apart from Railway Officers' Club, various other institute with sports and cultural facilities have been established by railways.

Bell Institute 
It includes Football ground, Badminton Court, Cultural hall, etc. It is open for public booking.

Kazi Nazrul Institute 

It is used largely for cultural events etc. It is open for public booking.

Khudiram Bose Institute 
It includes Football ground and auditorium for cultural events. It is open for public booking.

References

External links 
 Official Page
 Activities
 Bell Institute

Railway workshops in India